Aurantiosporium is a genus of fungi found in the family Microbotryaceae. It contains 5 species.

References

Basidiomycota genera
Microbotryales
Taxa named by Franz Oberwinkler
Taxa described in 1996